Roberto Lacalendola is a Grand Prix motorcycle racer from Italy.

Career statistics

Grand Prix motorcycle racing

By season

Races by year

References

External links
 Profile on motogp.com
 motoblog.it article

1988 births
Living people
Italian motorcycle racers
125cc World Championship riders
FIM Superstock 1000 Cup riders
Sportspeople from Turin